Stiletto is a 2016 novel by author Daniel O'Malley, the sequel to his The Rook. It was published by   Little, Brown and Company, Hachette Book Group, in 2016; according to WorldCat, it is in 440 libraries

Plot
Following the events chronicled in The Rook, Odette Leliefeld, great-great-great-great-great-granddaughter of the Grafters' leader finds herself a member of the delegation negotiating the complex details of the peace agreement between the Grafters and the Checquy Group.  The residual hostility and suspicion between the groups makes things difficult and forces Checquy Rook Myfanwy Thomas to reassign Pawn Felicity Clements from a coveted position on an assault team to serve as Odette's personal bodyguard.  Meanwhile, a series of manifestations that could be of Grafter origin threaten the negotiations.  Could the negotiations be an intricate double cross or are things not quite what they seem?

Comments
This story is primarily told from the POV of Odette and Felicity.  Rook Thomas and the rest of the court appear as featured players.  There are new court members introduced to help move the story along.

References

https://www.goodreads.com/book/show/25695756-stiletto

2016 American novels
Urban fantasy novels
Hachette (publisher) books